The 2015–16 NCAA Division I men's basketball season began on November 13. The first tournament was the 2K Sports Classic and ended with the Final Four in Houston April 2–4. Practices officially began on October 2.

Rule changes
The following rule changes were proposed by the NCAA Men's Rules Committee for the 2015–16 season, and officially approved by the NCAA Men's Playing Rules Oversight Panel:
 Reducing the shot clock from 35 to 30 seconds (same as the women's game).
 Providing offensive players the same verticality protections as defensive players.
 Extending the restricted-area arc from 3 feet to 4 feet from the basket.
 Reducing the number of team timeouts from 5 to 4, with a limit of no more than 3 timeouts in the second half.
 Ending the practice of coaches calling timeouts from the bench in live-ball situations.
 Tightening the 10-second backcourt rule, under which the offensive team has 10 seconds to advance the ball from the backcourt to the frontcourt. The following situations, all of which resulted in a reset of the 10-second count under previous rules, no longer reset the count:
 The defense deflects the ball out of bounds.
 A held ball situation in the offensive backcourt in which the possession arrow favors the offense.
 A technical foul against the offensive team during possession in its own backcourt. 
 Eliminating the five-second "closely-guarded" rule while the ball is being dribbled.
 Allowing for technical fouls to be called on players who are determined to have faked a foul while reviewing for a flagrant foul.
 Allow video replay of shot-clock violations throughout the game. Previously, this type of review was limited to only the final 2:00 of the game and in overtime.
 "Class B" technical fouls, such as hanging on the rim and delay of game, now result in one free throw by the non-violating team instead of the previous two.
 Requiring that a timeout taken 30 seconds or less before a scheduled media timeout break (which are at 16:00, 12:00, 8:00, and 4:00 of each half) become the media timeout. This particular change had been made in NCAA women's basketball effective with the 2013–14 season.
 Stricter enforcement of resumption of play after timeouts, and reducing from 20 seconds to 15 seconds the time allowed to replace a disqualified (fouled out) player. Teams will receive a delay-of-game warning after the first violation, and a Class B technical foul for each subsequent violation.
 Dunking will be allowed during team warmups and halftime.
 An experimental rule allowing players six personal fouls instead of five will be used in all national postseason tournaments except for the NCAA tournament.

Season headlines 
 May 27 – The NCAA announced its Academic Progress Rate (APR) sanctions for the 2015–16 school year. A total of 21 programs in 9 sports were declared ineligible for postseason play due to failure to meet the required APR benchmark, including the following four Division I men's basketball teams:
 Alcorn State
 Florida A&M
 Stetson
 Central Arkansas
 June 29 – Wisconsin head coach Bo Ryan announced he would retire at the end of the 2015–16 season.
 August 13 – Ryan backed away from his previously announced retirement plans, saying that he was open to staying on beyond this season and that he would make his decision in the coming months.
 September 29 – The NCAA announced penalties against SMU following an investigation into a wide array of violations:
 The Mustangs were banned from postseason play for 2015–16.
 Head coach Larry Brown was suspended for nine games.
 SMU lost nine men's basketball scholarships from 2016–17 through 2018–19. Since the team had only 11 scholarship players for 2015–16, two short of the NCAA limit of 13, the two unused scholarships counted toward the penalty.
 The men's basketball program was hit with three years' probation.
 October 2 – Yahoo! Sports revealed that the University of Louisville was investigating allegations made in a soon-to-be-published book whose author, a self-described madam, claimed that she had been paid thousands of dollars by former Louisville graduate assistant and director of basketball operations Andre McGee to provide women to dance for and have sex with Cardinals players and recruits.
 November 10 – The Associated Press preseason All-American team was released. Gonzaga forward Kyle Wiltjer was the leading vote-getter (51 votes). Joining him on the team were Iowa State forward Georges Niang (46 votes), Providence guard Kris Dunn (43), Oklahoma guard Buddy Hield (40) and LSU forward Ben Simmons (28).
 December 15 – Bo Ryan announced his retirement after a win against Texas A&M–Corpus Christi, effective immediately, with associate head coach Greg Gard assuming the title of interim head coach.
 December 23 – The NCAA announced penalties against Hawaii for significant violations of NCAA rules:
 Former head coach Gib Arnold, who had been fired shortly before the 2014–15 season, received a three-year show-cause penalty. An assistant involved in the violations received a two-year show-cause.
 The Rainbow Warriors were banned from postseason play in 2016–17.
 The team lost two scholarships in both 2016–17 and 2017–18; it had previously announced a reduction of one scholarship for each of those seasons.
 January 13
 The NCAA Division I council approved the following changes to its rules regarding declaration for the NBA draft:
 Declaration for the draft no longer results in automatic loss of college eligibility. As long as a player does not sign a contract with a professional team outside the NBA, or sign with an agent, he will retain college eligibility as long as he makes a timely withdrawal from the draft.
 NCAA players now have until 10 days after the end of the NBA Draft Combine to withdraw from the draft. For 2016, the withdrawal date was May 25, about five weeks after the previous mid-April deadline.
 NCAA players may participate in the draft combine, and are also allowed to attend one tryout per year with each NBA team without losing college eligibility.
 NCAA players may now enter and withdraw from the draft multiple times without loss of eligibility. Previously, the NCAA treated a second declaration of draft eligibility as a permanent loss of college eligibility.
 Missouri admitted to major NCAA violations dating to 2011. While the NCAA had yet to announce its findings, Missouri voluntarily imposed the following sanctions:
 The Tigers would not participate in any postseason play this season, including the SEC tournament.
 All 23 of the Tigers' wins in the 2013–14 season were vacated.
 The Tigers lost one scholarship in each of the next two seasons, and restrict recruiting in 2016–17.
 February 6
 Louisville self-imposed a 2016 postseason ban.
 March 10
 The Ivy League announced that it would institute men's and women's conference tournaments effective with the 2016–17 season. The top four teams in the regular-season standings qualify for each tournament. While the tournament winners receive automatic bids to the NCAA men's and women's tournaments, the official conference champions continue to be determined solely by regular-season results. The inaugural editions were held March 11–12, 2017 at the Palestra in Philadelphia.
 April 8 – The NCAA announced penalties against Southern Miss for a wide array of violations occurring during the tenure of former head coach Donnie Tyndall. The NCAA's findings indicated that mere weeks after Tyndall became head coach, he directed program staffers to complete fraudulent coursework so that several recruits would ostensibly be eligible to play. It was also found that Tyndall had arranged for cash payments to recruits, fabricated documents in an attempt to cover up the payments, and deleted emails relevant to the investigation.
 Tyndall received a 10-year show-cause, and even after it expires in 2026, he will be suspended for 50% of his next full season as an NCAA coach. Three of his assistants receive 8-year, 7-year, and 6-year penalties. At the time, Tyndall planned to appeal his penalty.
 The NCAA accepted the school's self-imposed two-year postseason ban, but placed the Golden Eagles on three years' probation. All wins in which ineligible players participated were vacated, and the Golden Eagles lost four scholarships over the next three seasons.

Milestones and records
During the season, the following players reached the 2000 career point milestone – Evansville guard D. J. Balentine, High Point forward John Brown, Hofstra guard Juan'ya Green, Louisiana–Lafayette forward Shawn Long, Iowa State forward Georges Niang, Old Dominion guard Trey Freeman, Oklahoma guard Buddy Hield, Stony Brook forward Jameel Warney, Louisville guard Damion Lee, Fresno State guard Marvelle Harris, Army swingman Kyle Wilson. and Iona guard A. J. English.
November 26 – Michigan State head coach Tom Izzo wins his 500th game.
November 28 – Davidson head coach Bob McKillop wins his 500th game.
November 28 – BYU's Kyle Collinsworth records his seventh career triple-double, giving him sole possession of the NCAA record.
 January 26 – Virginia beats Wake Forest on a 9–1 run in the final fifteen seconds, including a buzzer beater three-point bank shot from Darius Thompson, in a comeback highly noted for its statistical improbability.
February 1 – Duke's streak of 167 appearances in the AP Poll ended as the 5th longest streak of all time.
 February 5 – Yale's Brandon Sherrod, who entered the Bulldogs' game against Columbia one shy of the Division I record of 26 consecutive field goals made, makes his first five field goal attempts in Yale's 86–72 win to set a new record of 30.
 February 8 – The 2015–16 Villanova Wildcats became the program's first team to reach number one in the AP Poll by climbing to the top of the 2015–16 NCAA Division I men's basketball rankings.
March 16 – In BYU's 97–79 victory over UAB in the first round of the NIT, Collinsworth posts his sixth triple-double of the season, tying his own single-season record from last season and extending his NCAA career record to 12.

Conference membership changes

After a tumultuous four years in which over 80 Division I schools moved to new conferences—some more than once—only two schools joined new conferences as full members for 2015–16:

Another change in membership involved the Western Athletic Conference (WAC). This did not involve a school moving to a new league, but rather a change in identity of a Division I school. During the summer of 2015, the University of Texas–Pan American (UTPA) and the University of Texas at Brownsville (UTB) merged to form the new University of Texas Rio Grande Valley (UTRGV). The UTPA athletic program was inherited by UTRGV, which retained UTPA's WAC membership.

Following UAB's decision to drop football at the end of the 2014 season, its future membership in Conference USA (C-USA) beyond 2014–15 was initially uncertain, as league bylaws require all member schools to either sponsor FBS football or be committed to establishing an FBS program. Due to ongoing efforts by boosters and other supporters to raise funds to bring UAB football back, C-USA indicated that UAB would be allowed to remain in the league for the 2015–16 season, but not beyond that time unless football was reinstated. On June 1, 2015, UAB initially announced that the football program would be reinstated in 2016, later pushing back the return of football to 2017; this was sufficient to satisfy C-USA, which announced that it would keep UAB as a member.

The 2015–16 season was the last for Coastal Carolina in the Big South Conference. On September 1, 2015, the university and the Sun Belt Conference jointly announced that the Chanticleers would join the Sun Belt in July 2016, initially as a non-football member. The football team will join the Sun Belt in 2017, the second year of its transition from FCS to FBS football.

New arenas
 The Omaha Mavericks left their home since 2012, the off-campus Ralston Arena, for the new on-campus Baxter Arena. The Mavericks' first game in the new arena was on November 13 against the UC Santa Barbara Gauchos, with the Mavericks losing 60–59.
 The Ole Miss Rebels also opened a new arena, but unlike Omaha, the move was from one campus venue to another. Tad Smith Coliseum, home to the Rebels since 1966, was replaced by The Pavilion at Ole Miss. The new arena, with a capacity of 9,500, opened on January 7, with the Rebels defeating Alabama 74–66.

Season outlook

Pre–season polls

The top 25 from the AP and USA Today Coaches Polls.

Regular season

Early season tournaments

Conference winners and tournaments
Thirty-one athletic conferences each end their regular seasons with a single-elimination tournament. The team with the best regular-season record in each conference is given the number one seed in each tournament, with tiebreakers used as needed in the case of ties for the top seeding. All conferences also recognize regular-season champions, with co-championships being awarded in the case of ties. The winners of these tournaments receive automatic invitations to the 2016 NCAA Men's Division I Basketball Tournament. For the final time, the Ivy League did not hold a conference tournament, instead giving its automatic invitation to its regular season champion.

Statistical leaders

Postseason

NCAA tournament

Tournament upsets
For this list, a "major upset" is defined as a win by a team seeded 7 or more spots below its defeated opponent.

Final Four  – NRG Stadium, Houston, Texas

National Invitation tournament

After the NCAA tournament field was announced, the NCAA invited 32 teams to participate in the National Invitation Tournament. The tournament began on March 15, 2016 with all games prior to the semifinals were played on campus sites.

NIT Semifinals and Final
Played at Madison Square Garden in New York City on March 29 and 31

The semifinals and final were held on March 29 and March 31 at Madison Square Garden in New York City.

Vegas 16 tournament

After the NCAA tournament field was announced, 8 teams were invited to participate in the first ever Vegas 16 Tournament. The tournament began on March 28, 2016 with all 8 teams playing in the opening round.  The semifinals was played on March 29, and the Championship game on March 30.  All games were played  at Mandalay Bay Events Center in Las Vegas.

College Basketball Invitational

The ninth College Basketball Invitational (CBI) Tournament began on March 15, 2016. This tournament featured 16 teams who were left out of the NCAA tournament and NIT.

CollegeInsider.com Postseason tournament

The eighth CollegeInsider.com Postseason Tournament began on March 14 and ended with that championship game on March 29. This tournament places an emphasis on selecting successful teams from "mid-major" conferences who were left out of the NCAA tournament and NIT. 26 teams participated in this tournament.

Conference standings

Award winners

Consensus All-American teams

The following players are recognized as the 2016 Consensus All-Americans:

Major player of the year awards
Wooden Award: Buddy Hield, Oklahoma
Naismith Award: Buddy Hield, Oklahoma
Associated Press Player of the Year: Denzel Valentine, Michigan State
NABC Player of the Year: Denzel Valentine, Michigan State
Oscar Robertson Trophy (USBWA): Buddy Hield, Oklahoma
Sporting News Player of the Year: Buddy Hield, Oklahoma

Major freshman of the year awards
Wayman Tisdale Award (USBWA): Ben Simmons, LSU

Major coach of the year awards
Associated Press Coach of the Year: Bill Self, Kansas
Henry Iba Award (USBWA): Chris Mack, Xavier
NABC Coach of the Year: Bill Self, Kansas
Naismith College Coach of the Year: Jay Wright, Villanova
 Sporting News Coach of the Year: Tubby Smith, Texas Tech

Other major awards
Bob Cousy Award (Best point guard): Tyler Ulis, Kentucky
Jerry West Award (Best shooting guard): Buddy Hield, Oklahoma
Julius Erving Award (Best small forward): Denzel Valentine, Michigan State
Karl Malone Award (Best power forward): Georges Niang, Iowa State
Kareem Abdul-Jabbar Award (Best center): Jakob Pöltl, Utah
Pete Newell Big Man Award (Best big man): Jakob Pöltl, Utah
NABC Defensive Player of the Year: Malcolm Brogdon, Virginia
Senior CLASS Award (top senior): Denzel Valentine, Michigan State
Robert V. Geasey Trophy (Top player in Philadelphia Big 5): DeAndre' Bembry, Saint Joseph's
Haggerty Award (Top player in New York City metro area): Isaiah Whitehead, Seton Hall
Ben Jobe Award (Top minority coach): Dana Ford, Tennessee State
Hugh Durham Award (Top mid-major coach): James Jones, Yale
Jim Phelan Award (Top head coach): Greg Gard, Wisconsin
Lefty Driesell Award (Top defensive player): Vashil Fernandez, Valparaiso
Lou Henson Award (Top mid-major player): Thomas Walkup, Stephen F. Austin
Lute Olson Award (Top non-freshman or transfer player): Denzel Valentine, Michigan State
Skip Prosser Man of the Year Award (Coach with moral character): Zach Spiker, Army
Academic All-American of the Year (Top scholar-athlete): Jarrod Uthoff, Iowa
Elite 90 Award (Top GPA among upperclass players at Final Four): C. J. Cole, Oklahoma

Coaching changes
Several teams changed coaches during and after the season.

See also
2015–16 NCAA Division I women's basketball season

Notes

References